Rumatiki Ruth Wright  (née Gray, 27 April 1908 – 15 December 1982) was a notable New Zealand community leader and Māori welfare officer. Of Māori descent, she identified with the Ngāti Kura iwi. She was born in Pipiriki, New Zealand in 1908.

In the 1958 New Year Honours Wright was appointed a Member of the Order of the British Empire for services to the Māori people, especially as senior lady Māori welfare officer at Taumarunui.

References

1908 births
1982 deaths
New Zealand Māori people
New Zealand Members of the Order of the British Empire
People from Manawatū-Whanganui